Misael Aldair Dávila Carvajal (born 17 July 1991) is a Chilean footballer that currently plays for Primera División club Palestino as a midfielder.

Honours

Club
Deportes Iquique
 Copa Chile: 2010
 Primera B: 2010

External links
 Misael Dávila at Football-Lineups
 
 

1991 births
Living people
Chilean footballers
Chile youth international footballers
Primera B de Chile players
Chilean Primera División players
Deportes Iquique footballers
Deportes Temuco footballers
Unión Española footballers
Association football midfielders
People from Iquique